Jude Wright (born 14 November 1999) is an English actor.

Career
Wright is best known for his role as Marcus in the television series Spy, that ran from 2011 to 2012. Jude played Sam in the Channel 4 miniseries World Without End in 2012. He also starred in the HSBC British & Irish Lions advertisement  for the 2013 Australia tour, as the cabin boy.

In 2013, Wright appeared in The Christmas Candle. More recently, he co-starred in Paddington (released November 2014), playing Tony, and The Woman in Black: Angel of Death, which was released in January 2015. Also in 2015, Jude appeared in Season 3 of BBC Worldwide's Da Vinci's Demons, where he played Leonardo da Vinci's son Andrea.

He won the prize for the best performance for a sitcom for the young actors category, awarded by theskykid.com.

References

External links

1999 births
Living people
People from Chelsea, London
English male film actors
English film producers
English male television actors
21st-century English male actors